Georgetown University in Qatar (GU-Q) is a campus of Georgetown University (Washington, D.C.) in Education City, outside of Doha, Qatar. It is one of Georgetown University's eleven undergraduate and graduate schools, and is supported by a partnership between Qatar Foundation and Georgetown University.

In 2015, the university broadened its remit to include executive and professional education and custom training programs, in addition to the primary Bachelor of Science in Foreign Service degree. It rebranded to Georgetown University in Qatar (previously Georgetown University School of Foreign Service in Qatar or SFS-Q) to reflect the broadening of its remit.

Background
In 2002 Georgetown University studied the feasibility of opening a campus of the Edmund A. Walsh School of Foreign Service in Qatar in October 2002 and joined four other U.S. universities in opening a campus in Education City in 2005.

The campus is also home to the Center for International and Regional Studies (CIRS), GU-Q's premier research institute, which focuses on issues facing the Middle East and broader Asian region.

Academics

Undergraduate programs 
Georgetown offers a four-year Bachelor of Science in Foreign Service (BSFS), with four majors within the program, the curriculum and course materials of which are identical to those offered at Georgetown's main campus in Washington D.C: 
 Culture and Politics (CULP)
 International Economics (IECO)
 International History (IHIST)
 International Politics (IPOL)
Georgetown University in Qatar also offers three certificate options:
 The Certificate in American Studies 
 The Certificate in Arab and Regional Studies 
 The Certificate in Media and Politics
Additionally, GU-Q offers three minors:
 Africana Studies Minor
 Arabic Language Program and Minor
 Indian Ocean Studies Minor

Executive and Professional programs 
Georgetown University in Qatar offers three executive master's programs:

 Executive Master's in Diplomacy and International Affairs (EMDIA)
 International Executive Master's in Emergency and Disaster Management (IEDM)
 Executive Master's in Leadership-Qatar (EML-Q)

GU-Q also offers custom designed certificates, including programs on Public-Private Partnerships and Strategic Leadership Development.

Faculty 
In 2022, GU-Q faculty numbered 66, which includes both teaching and research staff.

The Center for International and Regional Studies (CIRS) sponsors studies of regional and international significance, including research initiatives in the areas of international relations, political economy, and domestic politics of the Persian Gulf.

Admission 
Georgetown University in Qatar has an acceptance rate of 27% for the Class of 2021.

Research 
Past and current research projects have included the study of Islamic bioethics, skills training for migrant workers, food security in Qatar, Arabic language pedagogy for heritage learners, and the history of women in Persian Gulf countries, among many other topics. Funding sources are available both within GU-Q and from external funding bodies.

GU-Q students formed the Middle Eastern Studies Association (MESSA) in 2012 as a forum for organizing an annual global conference to showcase undergraduate research in the social sciences and humanities. The conference is also fully organized by GU-Q students who consult extensively with a faculty board to help select papers for presentation and to peer review papers for possible publication in the annual Journal of the Georgetown University in Qatar Middle Eastern Studies Student Association. This journal is the first peer-reviewed scholarly journal run by students in Qatar.

GU-Q students have access to research grants funded by the Qatar National Research Fund Undergraduate Research Experience Program (QNRF-UREP) for research projects with topics that are relevant to Qatar's national development.

Campus

The Georgetown University in Qatar building in Education City was inaugurated in February 2011. The purpose-built 360,000-square-foot (33,000 m2) building features a three-story high atrium, an auditorium with a seating capacity for 300 people and 14 classrooms and lecture halls. It includes offices, classrooms, a library and other facilities for more than 200 undergraduate and graduate students. The facility was designed by Mexican architect Ricardo Legorreta.

Library 
GU-Q Library offers online access to more than 2 million scholarly resources and an intercampus loans service with Georgetown's library services in Washington DC. There is also an interlibrary loans services agreement with other universities on the Education City campus and with Qatar University. The Library houses over 90,000 books, and over 6,000 multimedia items.

The Library space is open to the public. As of 2016, over 650,000 members of the GU-Q community and the general public have visited the library since 2005.

Student life
About 25 student organizations exist on the school's campus. Student organizations include The Georgetown Gazette, Brainfood, the Women's Society and Development Club, Amal, Hoya Empowerment and Learning Program (HELP), Model United Nations, Photography Club, Senior Class Committee, Performing Arts Club, The Free Society, Georgetown Business Society (GBS), Students for Justice in Palestine (GUQ-SJP), Southeast and East Asian Student Association (SEA), and the Georgetown Investment Association (GIA). Funding for student organizations comes from the Student Activities Commission (SAC) while the student body as a whole is represented by the Student Government Association (SGA).

GUQ-Student Government Association (GUQ-SGA)

The Student Government Association (GUQ-SGA) is an annually elected, student-run governance association that works to represent the student body of Georgetown University in Qatar and liaise with university administrators. In addition, The President of SGA chairs the Student Liaison Commission (SLC), and The Vice President chairs the Student Activities Commission (SAC). The SGA has 11 members, replaced annually. An executive group made up of the President, the Vice President, and the Public Relations Officer guide and preside over the functions of the SGA. A core group of 8 members represents the interests of the student body, with two representatives from each undergraduate class. The SGA meets on a weekly basis and discusses the issues or concerns raised by the student body. The President is also a member of the Dean's subcommittees for various issues such as the Dean's subcommittee for sustainability.
The introduction of the Red Square, a replica of the famous Red Square in Georgetown University's main campus in Washington D.C., was a result of an initiative of the SGA led by President Malak Elmoh (SFS-Q '21).

Sheikh Mohammed bin Hamad bin Khalifa Al Thani (SFS-Q '09), the first President of the SGA was elected in 2006. Since then, the SGA have had a total of 15 Presidents.

The former Presidents of the Student Government Association include,

The Senate of GUQ-SGA is made up of two class representatives from each batch at GUQ. They work alongside the SGA President and the executive board to accomplish and meet the student needs. 
Apart from representing students within GUQ, the SGA also represents them in the Education City Student Government Association(ECSGA),an initiative started by President Hadi Darvishi in 2009 combining the Student Governments of various universities in Education City. In 2022, under the leadership of President Kurian, GUQ-SGA hosted a meeting of the ECSGA at Georgetown University in Qatar.This was the first meeting of ECSGA in about four years. GUQ-SGA also holds strong connections with Georgetown University Student Association(GUSA) and Georgetown University Graduate Student Government (GradGov),as part of their ‘One Georgetown’ initiative.

Criticism and controversy
Georgetown has been the subject of ongoing criticism of whether it is appropriate to maintain a campus in Qatar, given the Qatar's alleged links to state-sponsored terrorism, comparatively less academic freedom than its home country, and the country's de facto absolute monarchy. In an article without byline published by Gulf News Journal, Herbert London, a conservative pro-Israel activist who is founder and president of the eponymous London Center for Policy Research and a senior fellow at the think tank Manhattan Institute, said "universities I think have compromised themselves" by having campuses in "an environment like Qatar" where "free and open exchange of ideas" is impermissible.

Along with other universities with campuses in Qatar, Georgetown has received criticism for accepting money from Qatar due to their alleged support of terrorism worldwide and their poor human rights record, especially in the lead up to the 2022 World Cup. Some question if universities who profit from campuses in Qatar are thereby complicit in Qatar's alleged sponsorship of terrorism and human rights abuses.

List of deans

See also 
 List of universities and colleges in Qatar

References

External links

Official website

American international schools
Educational institutions established in 2005
Universities in Qatar
Qatar
2005 establishments in Qatar
Education City